Interurbano Line, is a commuter railway line in Costa Rica, operated by the national public railway operator Incofer. The line connects the provinces of Alajuela, Heredia, San José and Cartago.

History 

Costa Rica had two main lines for freight and passenger transportation, the Pacific line (between San José and Puntarenas) and the Atlantic line (between Alajuela, through Heredia and San José to Limón), both of which converge in the San José canton, with the eponymous terminus station of each line a mere 2 kilometer apart, which are connected by rail. 

Between 1993 and 1995 a brief passenger service made use of the tracks, but it was not enough to keep Incofer working, as the institution have been running in a deficit for a long time, for which it was technically closed in 1995.

Incofer then recreated the Interurbano as a commuter single line making use of this available infrastructure.

The initial train line was between Pavas and Montes de Oca, in 2005.

In 2008 the announcement of extending the line to Heredia started works on cleaning up the old line, trial runs were executed with derails being common, the initial service of the current rebooted Interurbano was between the Atlántico station and Heredia station, which started on 2009. New rolling stock from Spain, the Apolo 2400 units, were imported in 2009.

Future 

Stage Zero of electrification
New plans to electrify the passenger lines are in place, beginning with a "Stage Zero" which means to start with new more efficient diesel powered rolling stock.  These eight new units were ordered from the Chinese company CRRC Qingdao Sifang; they will have more space and the seats are arranged along the walls of the units, a first in the country.

With the new units it will be possible to extend and provide the service to Paraíso, Cartago and San Rafael, Alajuela.

A projected start date for a bidirectional electric railway line is set for around the year 2025, with bidding offers starting in 2022.

Line data 

From its reopening the train crossings at street level didn't have barriers, bells or any other security measure; despite a lot of honking accidents between the train and cars are common, as well as accidents with pedestrians, in 2018 security measures were installed at 45 crossings, with plans to grow to 136, but vandalism and accidents against the barriers are common.  

Street running trains are common in several places; the track(s), As well as some stations lay directly in/on (the middle of) the narrow streets.

Services 
There are three services running on the Interurbano line, all of them use the same rolling stock interchangeably, and the range of a service might include part of another. There is no express services, all stops are served.

Cartago
Making use of the old railroad line to the Atlantic, but finishing in Los Ángeles neighborhood, Cartago, as of October 2019, with plans to continue towards Paraíso. Shaded stops are only served at rush hour.

Planned extension
Railway tracks clearing and recovery, as well as new bridges and infrastructure is under construction for extending the Cartago service to these two stops.

Belén-Pavas–Curridabat 

Using the railroad line to the Pacific, with a small segment of the line to the Atlantic. Shaded stops are only served at rush hour.

Planned extension
Railway tracks clearing and recovery is under way to provide access to this stop in the Belén-Pavas–Curridabat service.

Alajuela-Río Segundo-Heredia-San José 
Uses the segment from Alajuela through Heredia toward the Atlantic station. Darker shaded stops are only served at rush hour.

Rolling stock 
The lines runs on diesel locomotives and units:

 :es:Serie 2400 de Renfe, from Renfe Operadora, Spain.
 GE Universal 11B
 Some of the passenger cars were built in the country by :es:COOPESA.

See also  
 Rail transport in Costa Rica

References 

Rail transport in Costa Rica
3 ft 6 in gauge railways in Costa Rica